Amorphoscelis pulchella is a species of praying mantis found in Angola, Uganda,  Zimbabwe and the Congo River region.

References

Amorphoscelis
Mantodea of Africa
Insects described in 1913